In computational complexity theory, a fine-grained reduction is a transformation from one computational problem to another, used to relate the difficulty of improving the time bounds for the two problems.
Intuitively, it provides a method for solving one problem efficiently by using the solution to the other problem as a subroutine.
If problem  can be solved in time  and problem  can be solved in time , then the existence of an -reduction from problem  to problem  implies that any significant speedup for problem  would also lead to a speedup for problem .

Definition
Let  and  be computational problems, specified as the desired output for each possible input.
Let  and  both be time-constructible functions that take an integer argument  and produce an integer result.

Then  is said to be -reducible to 

Speedup implication
Then, with these assumptions, there also exists  such that  can be solved in time .

History
They also showed the existence of -reductions between several problems including all-pairs shortest paths, finding the second-shortest path between two given vertices in a weighted graph, finding negative-weight triangles in weighted graphs, and testing whether a given distance matrix describes a metric space. According to their results, either all of these problems have time bounds with exponents less than three, or none of them do.

The term "fine-grained reduction" comes from later work by Virginia Vassilevska Williams in an invited presentation at the 10th International Symposium on Parameterized and Exact Computation.

Although the original definition of fine-grained reductions involved deterministic algorithms, the corresponding concepts for randomized algorithms and nondeterministic algorithms have also been considered.

References

Reduction (complexity)